Montevarchi Calcio Aquila 1902 is an Italian professional football club, based in Montevarchi, Tuscany.

History

Foundation 
The club was founded in 1902 as  Società Ciclistica Aquila and in 1926 was renamed Club Sportivo Aquila Montevarchi.

Montevarchi in the season 2010–11, from Serie D group E was relegated, in the play-out, to Eccellenza Tuscany.

Dissolution 
On 24 November 2011 it was declared bankrupt and immediately excluded from the championship of Eccellenza Tuscany with the consequent radiation from the Italian football.

Rivalry 

Its main rivalries of Tuscany included Arezzo, Carrarese, Sangiovannese, Siena, Viareggio, Poggibonsi, Prato, Lucchese, Pistoiese and Massese and those outside the region included Alessandria, Foligno, Pavia and Gualdo.

Colors and badge 
The team's colors were red and purple. The purple was often mistaken for dark blue.

Players

First team squad

.

Out on loan

League and cup history

Relegation play-out result history 
2005–06: Relegated to Serie D after losing out to Prato
2007–08: Stayed in Serie D after defeating Cecina

Honours
 Coppa Italia Dilettanti
 Winners: 1983–84

References 

 
Football clubs in Tuscany
Association football clubs established in 1902
Serie C clubs
1902 establishments in Italy